Yamparáez is a province in the Bolivian department of Chuquisaca. It is divided in two sections: first section with head in the town of Tarabuco, and the second section with its head in Yamparáez.

Subdivision 
The province is divided into two municipalities which are further subdivided into cantons.

The people 
The people are predominantly indigenous citizens of Quechuan descent.

Ref.: obd.descentralizacion.gov.bo

Languages 
The languages spoken in the province are mainly Quechua and Spanish.

Ref.: obd.descentralizacion.gov.bo

Provinces of Chuquisaca Department